Uzuntash (also Romanized as Ūzūntāsh; also known as Azūtāsh and Ozūntāsh) is a village in Kani Bazar Rural District, Khalifan District, Mahabad County, West Azerbaijan Province, Iran. At the 2006 census, its population was 371, in 45 families.

References 

Populated places in Mahabad County